The Battle of Paso de las Damas was a battle of the Cuban War of Independence that took place on November 18, 1896, at the Santa Clara Province.

Background
Cuban Major General Serafín Sánchez, had previously participated in the Ten Years' War and the Little War for the independence of Cuba. The Cuban War of Independence was the continuation of the previous two wars and General Sánchez immediately joined the Mambises. Towards the last months of 1896, the Cuban independence forces were waging the Las Villas Campaign in mid-November of that year.

The Battle
The combat was meticulously prepared by General Sánchez in a field chosen by him. The regiments under his command, made up of approximately 800 men, attacked the enemy in the afternoon. The Spanish forces had been defeated the day before by the same Cuban forces. Now they brought 2,500 soldiers well armed and equipped with various pieces of artillery. They were led by Generals Armiñán and López de Amor.

During the battle, Major General Francisco Carrillo suffered a severe contusion to his face and the then Lieutenant Colonel Enrique Loynaz del Castillo was knocked off his horse, which collapsed on top of him, causing injuries. Given the lack of ammunition and the Spanish push, the Cuban troops withdrew in an orderly fashion. At that moment, an enemy bullet went through Serafín Sánchez's body, from the right shoulder to the left. His last words were: "They have killed me, that is nothing! Keep going!"

While the rear guard detained the enemy, the Cubans transported the body of General Sánchez to a safe place. The general died at 5:15 at November 18, 1896. He was buried the next day.

Aftermath
With this battle, the Mambí Army lost an important and experienced general, who, together with the previous deaths of Guillermón Moncada, Flor Crombet, José Martí and José Maceo, was added to the list of Cuban generals killed in this war, significantly affecting the military capacity of the Cubans.

References

Bibliography
Arcadio Ríos. Facts and characters in the History of Cuba. Bibliographic Compilation. Havana, 2015. 320 p.
Encyclopedic Dictionary of Military History of Cuba. Volume II. Combative actions. Center for Military Studies of the FAR, 2006.
Enrique Ubieta. Ephemerides of the Cuban Revolution, 4 t., Havana, 1920. Volume II. P. 287.
Enrique Loynaz del Castillo. Memories of the war, Havana, 1989. Págs. 380–390.
Serafin Sanchez. Diary and other documents, Sancti Spíritus, 1992. P. 67–69.
Sancti Spíritus History Team. Biographical notes of Major General Serafín Sánchez, Havana, 1986. Págs. 160–161.

Conflicts in 1896
Battles involving Spain
Spanish colonial period of Cuba
November 1896 events
Battles involving Cuba